Samadagha Shikhlarov (5 September 1955 – 1 June 2021) was an Azerbaijani professional footballer who played as forward for Neftchi Baku PFC, Khazar, OIK Kiev, Chiraqqala Siyazan.

Shikhlarov was well known for his heading ability, remembered for his two goals against Spartak Moscow in 1982. He played for the Neftchi Baku up to 152 times, by scoring 21 goals in Soviet Top League and twice for the Soviet Union Olympic national football team.

He was appointed Neftchi's scout in March 2009. He moved to Olimpik-Shuvalan PFC Baku after Nazim Suleymanov's arrival at the club.

Shikhlarov died in a car crash on Hasan Aliyev Street in Baku on 1 June 2021.

References

External links
Player's Official Site 
Player's Profile at Neftchi's Official Site
Player's Profile at klisf.info 

1955 births
2021 deaths
Azerbaijani footballers
Soviet footballers
People from Salyan, Azerbaijan
People from Şirvan, Azerbaijan
Association football forwards
Neftçi PFK players
FC CSKA Kyiv players
Soviet Top League players
Road incident deaths in Azerbaijan